Jay Moledzki is a Canadian skydiver/canopy pilot.  Moledzki is noted for having won many medals in canopy piloting since the first Canopy Piloting World Parachuting Championships in Vienna, Austria in 2006, the second Canopy Piloting World Championships in Pretoria, South Africa in 2008, the third Canopy Piloting World Championships in Kolomna, Russia in 2010, and the fourth Canopy Piloting World
Championships in Dubai, UAE in 2012.

References

External links 
 Canadian Sport Parachuting Association - Web page describing Moledski's medals at the 1st Canopy Piloting World Parachuting Championships.
 Fédération Aéronautique Internationale (FAI) - Web page describing Moledski's medals at the 2nd Canopy Piloting World Parachuting Championships.
 Fédération Aéronautique Internationale (FAI) - Web page describing Moledski's medals at the 3rd Canopy Piloting World Parachuting Championships.
 Fédération Aéronautique Internationale (FAI) - Web page describing Moledski's medals at the 4th Canopy Piloting World Parachuting Championships.

Year of birth missing (living people)
Living people
Canadian skydivers